Torben Iversen is a Danish political economist, currently Harold Hitchings Burbank Professor of Political Economy at Harvard University. In 2016, he was named  BP Centennial Professor at the London School of Economics.

References

Year of birth missing (living people)
Living people
Political economists
Harvard University faculty